This is the list of cathedrals in Vietnam.

Roman Catholic
Cathedrals of the Roman Catholic Church in Vietnam:

 Mary Mother of God Cathedral in Bà Rịa of Bà Rịa diocese
 Queen of the Rosary Cathedral in Bắc Ninh of Bắc Ninh diocese
 Sacred Heart Cathedral in Buôn Ma Thuột of Buôn Ma Thuột diocese
 Queen of the Rosary Cathedral in Nam Định of Bùi Chu diocese
 Sacred Heart Cathedral in Cần Thơ of Cần Thơ diocese
 St Nicholas of Bari Cathedral in Da Lat of Đà Lạt diocese
 Sacred Heart Cathedral in Da Nang of Đà Nẵng diocese
 St. Joseph’s Cathedral in Hanoi of Hà Nội archdiocese
 Queen of the Rosary Cathedral in Hải Phòng of Hải Phòng diocese
 Immaculate Heart of Mary Cathedral in Huế of Huế archdiocese
 St. Therese of the Child Jesus Cathedral in Sơn Tây of Hưng Hoá diocese
 Immaculate Conception Cathedral in Kon Tum of Kon Tum diocese
 St Joseph’s Cathedral in Lạng Sơn of Lạng Sơn & Cao Bằng diocese
 Queen of Peace Cathedral in Long Xuyên of Long Xuyên diocese
 Immaculate Conception Cathedral in Mỹ Tho of Mỹ Tho diocese
 Christ the King Cathedral in Nha Trang of Nha Trang diocese
 Sacred Heart Cathedral in Phan Thiết of Phan Thiết diocese
 Queen of the Rosary Cathedral in Ninh Bình of Phát Diệm diocese
 Sacred Heart Cathedral in Thủ Dầu Một of Phú Cường diocese
 Assumption Cathedral in Quy Nhơn of Quy Nhơn diocese
 Sacred Heart Cathedral in Thái Bình of Thái Bình diocese
 Immaculate Conception Cathedral in Thanh Hoá of Thanh Hoá diocese
 Immaculate Conception Cathedral Basilica in Ho Chi Minh City of Saigon archdiocese
 Assumption Cathedral in Nghệ An of Vinh diocese
 St Anne’s Cathedral in Vĩnh Long of Vĩnh Long diocese
 Christ the King Cathedral in Long Khánh of Xuân Lộc diocese

See also

List of cathedrals
Christianity in Vietnam

References

Churches in Vietnam
Vietnam
Cathedrals
Cathedrals